Chaowat Veerachat (born 23 June 1996) is a Thai professional footballer who plays as a midfielder. He represents the Thailand national team, and plays at club-level for J1 League club Cerezo Osaka, on loan from Thai League 1 club BG Pathum United.

International career
Chaowat won a gold medal at the 2017 Southeast Asian Games in Malaysia.

In 2022, he was called up to the Thailand national team for the friendly matches against Nepal and Suriname.

International goals

Under-16

Under-19

Under-23

Senior

Honours

Club
Buriram United
 Thai League 1: 2014, 2015
 Thai FA Cup: 2014, 2015
 Thai League Cup: 2014, 2015
 Toyota Premier Cup: 2016
 Kor Royal Cup: 2015
 Mekong Club Championship: 2015

BG Pathum United
 Thai League 1: 2020–21
 Thai League 2: 2019
 Thailand Champions Cup: 2021

International
Thailand U-16
 AFF U-16 Youth Championship: 2011

Thailand U-21
 Nations Cup: 2016

Thailand U-23
 Sea Games: 2015, 2017

References

External links
 
 Profile at Goal

1996 births
Living people
Chaowat Veerachat
Chaowat Veerachat
Chaowat Veerachat
Association football midfielders
Chaowat Veerachat
Chaowat Veerachat
Chaowat Veerachat
Chaowat Veerachat
Chaowat Veerachat
Southeast Asian Games medalists in football
Competitors at the 2015 Southeast Asian Games
Competitors at the 2017 Southeast Asian Games
Thai expatriate sportspeople in Japan